John Hugh Macmillan III (February 28, 1928 - April 23, 2008) was an American billionaire businessman.

Early life
He was born on February 28, 1928, in Minneapolis, Minnesota, the son of John H. Macmillan Jr. and Marion Dickson, and grew up in Wayzata, Minnesota.

He was educated at the Blake School, Berkshire School in Sheffield, Massachusetts, West High School, and the University of Minnesota.

Career
In 1955, Macmillan started working for Cargill as a grain merchant and held positions in Great Falls, Montana, Baton Rouge, Louisiana, and Minneapolis.

In 2007, Forbes estimated his net worth at $1.7 billion.

Personal life
His first wife was Susan Velie (1931-2003), with whom he had three children, John Hugh Macmillan IV, David Deere Macmillan, and Kate Macmillan Reed. She later married Henry W. Norton, and became Susan Velie Norton. He was married to Patricia A. Macmillan. He was survived by his nine children, John H. Macmillan IV (Louise), David Macmillan (Karen), Kate Reed (Harold), Anne Pedrero (Robert), Donald Macmillan (Cynthia), Sandra Kirkpatrick (Todd), Daniel Macmillan, Christopher Macmillan(Greta), and Andrew Macmillan(Christina).

He died on April 23, 2008, in Fort Lauderdale, Florida, and is buried at Lakewood Cemetery, Minneapolis.

References

1928 births
2008 deaths
Cargill people
Berkshire School alumni
University of Minnesota alumni
Burials at Lakewood Cemetery
20th-century American businesspeople